Bigherd (also Romanized as Bīgherd; also known as Bokherd and Bīqerd) is a town in Tang-e Narak Rural District, in the Central District of Khonj County, Fars Province, Iran. At the 2006 census, its population was 2,469, in 419 families.

References 

Populated places in Khonj County